Nicolay Greogorievich Natzvalov (1884 – May 25, 1919, in Vladivostok) was a participant of World War I and the Chief of Staff of the Special Manchurian Detachment, Major General (1918). He died due to suicide.

Early life 
He was born in Transbaikalia into a Georgian - Cossack family (original surname Natsvlishvili).

War Service 
He started his military service as a private during the Russo-Japanese War. In the course of the following war, Nicolay Natzvalov was awarded with the Order of St. George of the Fourth Degree and St. George's Honor Weapon.

Post-War Service 
After his demobilization, Nicolay Natzvalov joined the White movement in Transbaikal. He was appointed as the Chief of Staff of the Ataman Grigory Semyonov First Joint division and headed the 5th Pri-Amur Corps (December 8, 1918 to May 25, 1919).

References

 Волков С. В. Белое движение: Энцикл. Гражданской войны. — СПб., 2003.
 A history site

White movement generals
History of Zabaykalsky Krai
Primorsky Krai
Russian military personnel of the Russo-Japanese War
Russian military personnel of World War I
Russian people of Georgian descent
1884 births
1919 deaths